Yuliia Oleksandrivna Bebko (née Holovan; , born 11 October 1990), professionally known as Julia Sanina, is a Ukrainian singer and the front woman of the Ukrainian alternative rock band The Hardkiss.

Biography 
Sanina was born into a family of musicians on 11 October 1990 in Kyiv, Ukraine. She performed on the stage for the first time when she was three years old; her singing was then accompanied by an ensemble that her father directed. Eventually she started to perform as a solo vocalist, as well as one of the members of children's band and jazz big band.

In 2005, she graduated from the Music School of Jazz and Variety art. She later entered the Institute of Philology of Taras Shevchenko National University of Kyiv and obtained her master's degree in folklore studies in 2013. While studying in college she also grew her interest in journalism.

From 2006 to 2008 she was a vocalist in the band Sister Siren.

In September 2011 Sanina and music producer Valeriy Bebko created a pop duet Val & Sanina, which had performed songs in Russian. They recorded an experimental video clip and a few songs, one of them The love has come (lyrics: Robert Rozhdestvensky, music: Raimonds Pauls).

Shortly after they improved their stage image and changed their band's name to The Hardkiss. They also started to write songs in English all by themselves and made their sound heavier. In autumn 2011 they released few new songs and recorded their debut video clip Babylon. At the end of October 2011 The Hardkiss was opening for British band Hurts. Later that year they released another video clip Dance with me, that even aired on the leading music channels.

In February 2012 they signed a contract with label Sony BMG. The band rapidly started to gain popularity and won several awards in Ukraine, as well as in other foreign countries. In 2014 Sanina started to upload video blogs about her life and the band's life behind the scenes on her YouTube channel. In 2016 Sanina became one of four judges on the seventh series of The X Factor Ukraine.

Sanina will co-host the Eurovision Song Contest 2023 in Liverpool alongside Alesha Dixon and Hannah Waddingham with Graham Norton joining them for the final.

Personal life 
She married Valeriy "Val" Bebko, a creative producer and lead guitarist of The Hardkiss in 2011. They met in 2010 when Sanina interviewed Bebko, who was the producer of MTV Ukraine back then. The couple had hidden their relationship for the five years (since 2009), but they married after being together only for two years. Their wedding was decorated in Ukrainian authentic style. The couple's first child, Danylo, was born on  November 21, 2015.

Style 
Sanina pays a lot of attention to her outfits. Stylists like  Slava Tschaika and Vitaly Datsjuk create outfits for all members of The Hardkiss. The band also  works closely with young designers (Ivanova, Bekh, Nadia Dziak, Anouki Bicholla etc.). Sanina hugely admires the work of  Alexander MC Queen, Vivienne Westwood and Gareth Pugh. In everyday life she prefers to wear Diesel, H&M, Topshop.

References

External links
 
 The HARDKISS Vlog

Ukrainian rock singers
Taras Shevchenko National University of Kyiv alumni
Musicians from Kyiv
1990 births
Living people
21st-century Ukrainian women  singers